The  is a subway line in Japan owned and operated by Tokyo Metro. The line connects Wakōshi Station in Wakō, Saitama and Shin-Kiba Station in Kōtō, Tokyo. On maps, diagrams and signboards, the line is shown using the color "gold", and its stations are given numbers using the letter "Y".

The line was named after the Yūrakuchō business district in Chiyoda, Tokyo. According to the Tokyo urban transportation plan, however, it is more complicated. The line number assigned to the section south from Kotake-Mukaihara to Shin-Kiba is Line 8, but that north of Kotake-Mukaihara to Wakōshi is Line 13, which indicates the section is a portion of Fukutoshin Line which shares the same number.

Services
The Yurakucho Line has inter-running counterparts on its northern side, both of which are "major" Japanese private railway companies in Greater Tokyo.

According to the Tokyo Metropolitan Bureau of Transportation, as of June 2009 the Yurakucho Line is the fifth most crowded subway line in Tokyo, at its peak running at 173% capacity between Higashi-Ikebukuro and Gokokuji stations.

 services ran on the Yurakucho Line between June 14, 2008 and March 6, 2010, operating twice hourly between Wakōshi and Shin-Kiba. Between Wakōshi and Ikebukuro, semi-express trains stopped only at Kotake-Mukaihara; between Ikebukuro and Shin-Kiba, trains stopped at all stations. The semi-express trains ran between rush hours during weekdays and more frequently on weekends and holidays. These services were abolished and replaced with local services on March 6, 2010.

Since March 2008, very occasional Bay Resort limited express trains on the Odakyū Odawara Line operate to Shin-Kiba on the Yurakucho Line via a connecting track to the Chiyoda Line beyond Sakuradamon.

Since March 26, 2017, Seibu operates the S-Train limited-stop express service between Toyosu and Tokorozawa on the Seibu Ikebukuro Line on weekday mornings and evenings.

Station list
 Local trains stop at every station. 
S-Train services stop at the stations indicated by "●" and "↑" (alighting only during the morning, boarding only during the evening) and pass all stations indicated by "|".

Rolling stock
All types are operated as 10-car sets.

Tokyo Metro
 36x Tokyo Metro 10000 series (from September 2006)
 6x Tokyo Metro 17000 series (from 21 February 2021)

Other operators
Seibu 6000 and 6050 series (Not all sets are permitted to run on Yūrakuchō Line tracks)
Seibu 40000 series (S-Train services)
Seibu 40050 series
Tobu 9000 series x 8
Tobu 9050 series x 2
Tobu 50070 series (from July 2007)
Tokyu 5050-4000 series could run on the line, but only in the special case of emergency schedule adjustments.

Former rolling stock
Tokyo Metro 7000 series (from 1974 until 29 October 2021)
Tokyo Metro 07 series (from 1992 until 2007)
Odakyu 60000 series MSE (Romancecar, as Limited Express Bay Resort, occasionally)

Depots

 (main depot)
 (specializes in railcar refurbishment: also used for Chiyoda and Hanzōmon Line railcars)

History

 30 October 1974: Ikebukuro – Ginza-itchōme section opens.
 27 March 1980: Ginza-itchōme – Shintomichō section opens.
 24 June 1983: Eidan Narimasu (present Chikatetsu Narimasu) – Ikebukuro section opens
 1 October 1983: Seibu Railway Seibu Yūrakuchō Line Kotake-Mukaihara – Shin-Sakuradai section opened, through operation with Eidan Yūrakuchō Line begins.
 25 August 1987: Wakōshi – Eidan Narimasu opens. Through service to Tōbu Tōjō Line begins.
 8 June 1988: Shintomichō – Shin-kiba opens, current line completed.
 18 March 1993: 07 series EMUs introduced.
 7 December 1994: New line opened from Kotake-Mukaihara to Ikebukuro. This section was named the "Yūrakuchō New Line". All trains on it made Ikebukuro their terminus and did not stop at Senkawa nor Kanamechō.
 26 March 1998: Through operation to Seibu Ikebukuro Line begins.
 1 April 2004: The owner of the line changed from Teito Rapid Transit Authority (TRTA, Eidan) to Tokyo Metro due to the former's privatization.
 31 October 2005: Women-only cars introduced.
 1 September 2006: 10000 series introduced.
 3 May 2008: Limited Express "Bay Resort" (operated first from/to Odakyu Line) begins operating.
 14 June 2008: Tokyo Metro Fukutoshin Line began service. Yurakuchō New Line annexed by the Fukutoshin Line. Yurakuchō Line shares tracks with Fukutoshin Line between Wakōshi and Kotake-Mukaihara. Semi-Express service starts running.
 October 2008: Automatic train control enabled on the Yurakuchō Line.
 6 March 2010: Semi-express services abolished.
 6 August 2022: "Wanman" one-person operation begins on the section between Kotake-Mukaihara and Shin-Kiba

On 10 September 2012, 10-car 5050-4000 series sets entered revenue service on the Yurakucho Line, with inter-running through to the Tobu Tojo Line.

Future developments
An additional two stations (Edagawa and Sengoku) would also be added in the Koto Ward serving the Sengoku and Toyo districts. Tentative names for the new stations were determined in August 2022. The branch line (nicknamed the Toyozumi Line according to official city documents) is intended to aid in redevelopment efforts in Koto Ward. As of 28 January 2022 the expected cost of construction is ¥269 billion (2021) . The branch line is expected to be in service in the mid-2030s. 

A branch line from Toyosu Station has been planned since the early 1980s, heading north via Kameari Station (on the Jōban Line) to Noda in northwest Chiba Prefecture.

References

 Shaw, Dennis and Morioka, Hisashi, "Tokyo Subways", published 1992 by Hoikusha Publishing

External links

 Tokyo Metro website

Lines of Tokyo Metro
Railway lines in Tokyo
Rail transport in Saitama Prefecture
Tokyo Metro Yurakucho Line
Railway lines opened in 1974
1067 mm gauge railways in Japan
1974 establishments in Japan